A bamboula is a type of drum made from a rum barrel with skin stretched over one end. It is also a dance accompanied by music from these drums.

History

Originating in Africa, the bamboula form appears in a Haitian song in 1757 and bamboula became a dance syncopation performed to the rhythm of the drum during festivals and ceremonies in Haiti (then Saint-Domingue). It was then exported to the United States (notably Mobile, Alabama, and the Virgin Islands) through Louisiana, by the slaves who were deported to New Orleans during the 18th century with the arrival of the displaced French settlers of the island of San Domingo especially after the Haitian Revolution. The slaves congregated on the Congo Square to the edge of the area of the French Quarter of New Orleans to dance the bamboula.

In 1848, the American composer Louis Moreau Gottschalk, born in New Orleans, Louisiana, and whose maternal grandmother was a native of Saint-Domingue, composed a piece entitled Bamboula, the first of four Creole inspired piano works known as his Louisiana Quartet.

Use as an ethnic slur 
In the present-day French language, the word bamboula has become an ethnic slur, directed at black people.

References

External links
 Bamboula Dance Drums (includes audio sample), Smithsonian Global Sound.
 Bamboula Dance, Sonny Watson's StreetSwing
 

Drums
North American percussion instruments
Culture of New Orleans
Haitian musical instruments
Haitian dances
Afro-Virgin Islander culture
Dance in Louisiana
Anti-African and anti-black slurs